is a former Japanese football player.

Playing career
Naito was born in Nara on November 9, 1967. After graduating from Chukyo University, he joined Honda in 1990. He played many matches as forward and the club won the 2nd place 1991 JSL Cup. He moved to Kashima Antlers in 1992. However he could not play many matches behind Alcindo, Hisashi Kurosaki and Yoshiyuki Hasegawa. In 1995, he was converted to right side-back and became a regular player and the club won the champions 1996 J1 League. In 1997, his opportunity to play decreased behind Akira Narahashi who came to Antlers in 1997. In 1998, he was converted to defensive midfielder and played many matches at the position with Jorginho or Yasuto Honda and the club won the champions J1 League. In 2000, he moved to newly was promoted to J1 League club, FC Tokyo. In 2000 season, he played as regular player as right side back. However his opportunity to play decreased in 2001 and he moved to Avispa Fukuoka in August 2001. He left the club for generational change end of 2002 season. In 2003, he moved to Regional Leagues club Volca Kagoshima and retired end of 2003 season.

Coaching career
After a few years between women's and university's teams, Naito was hired to coach Tegevajaro Miyazaki in 2021 for their first-ever pro-season. In 2021, Tegevajaro ended up third in the table and Naito had a successful season, before leaving the spot to Yasushi Takasaki.

Club statistics
Updated to January 1st, 2022.

References

External links

Montedio Yamagata

1967 births
Living people
Chukyo University alumni
Association football people from Nara Prefecture
Japanese footballers
Japan Soccer League players
J1 League players
J2 League players
Honda FC players
Kashima Antlers players
FC Tokyo players
Avispa Fukuoka players
Association football defenders
J3 League managers
Tegevajaro Miyazaki managers